BC School Sports is an organisation dedicated to organising sport competition in the province of British Columbia, Canada.

Overview and History
BC School Sports was created in 1965, and was originally known as the British Columbia Federation of School Athletic Associations (BCFSAA). The group was founded by a group of teachers and administrators who were interested in creating an organisation that would assist in organising school sport functions. The first constitution of the group was adopted in 1966. The provincial government provided assistance to the group, and the organisation was able to open the doors of its first office in January 1970. The name changed from BCFSAA into British Columbia School Sports (BCSS or BC School Sports) in 1980-81.

Governing of the Group
The BCSS is self-governed by an assembly of the Member Schools. While the group is self-governed, they continue to accept input from several groups, including School Districts, the Ministry of Education, et al. The combined force of all the Member Schools is known as the Legislative Assembly. Together, they make decisions over BC School Sports' rules and regulation, policies of operation, fees, association advocacy programs, position statements, and membership programs and services.

Leaders

Association Presidents
BCSS has 22 different Association Presidents, as well as a number of different members of the Board of Directors, the list following includes contact information.

Sports
BCSS commissions 20 different sports. All information for these sports can be found on the referred website to the left of this sentence.
British Columbia School Sports commissions Aquatics, Badminton, Basketball Boys, Basketball Girls, Cross Country Running, Curling, Field Hockey, American Football, Golf, Gymnastics, Mountain Biking, Rugby Football, Skiing and Snowboarding, Soccer, Tennis, Track and Field, Volleyball Boys, Volleyball Girls, and Wrestling. All sports listed have Provincial Championships each year.

Recognition
BCSS offers several different awards to both students and coaches, and gives scholarships to students who are exceptional athletes.

Awards

Merit Award
The first award is the Merit Award. The award is a plaque that has been engraved with the recipient's name. A maximum of six people can be awarded it every year. To meet the criteria for the award, nominees must:
Have been a coach and/or a sponsor, administrator, or official at a school level.
Have been an administrator in at least one of the following: Executive of a Local Association, Executive of a Sport Commission, member of the Standing Committee, or member of the BCSS Board of Directors.
Must not currently be part of the BC School Sports Board of Directors.

Coach of the Year
The purpose of the Coach of the Year award, according to the British Columbia School Sports website, is to, "honour one male and one female colleague who have made an outstanding contribution over an extended period of time to coaching athletic programs in the secondary schools of British Columbia." The award is a shared perpetual plaque that has the name of both honorees engraved upon it. The plaque is then placed in the British Columbia School Sports office. Each coach will receive a replica along with $500 in order to help them advance their coaching abilities. To be eligible to be nominated, a coach must meet the following criteria:
Must have been actively involved in coaching high school athletics for a minimum of ten years.
Consistently promotes the philosophy of fair play and sportsmanship.
Must be, or have been, a teacher or school administrator.
Must not currently be a member of the BCSS Board of Directors.

Outstanding School Award
Each school year, BCSS picks one school in the province to be given this award. The purpose of the award, according to the organisation's website, is to, "recognize a school whose special commitment to improving the lives of its students and staff through athletics, intramurals, leadership and public service has contributed significantly to the welfare of school athletics in its local community and within the province." The award is a large plaque with an engraving consistent with native markings, and is put on display in the BCSS office. The school that is awarded is given a royal blue and gold banner to show that they have won the award. In order to be eligible for the award, the candidate school must be in good standing with the BCSS group, along with additional criteria:
Extent of Extent of extracurricular program;
Quality and extent of intramural program;
Staff involvement in coaching and sport administration;
Participation in various BCSS programs;
Awards earned, i.e. sportsmanship, individual or team excellence;
Public service projects;
Work done with special populations;
Fund raising projects;
Athletic program's contribution to the school community;
Special characteristics/activities unique to the school.

Honour Award
The Honour Award is a large certificate that is framed, with the recipient's name written on it. There is also a special Honour Award Pin. The recipient is further rewarded by receiving a Gold Card, which gives the honoree the ability to take themselves and a gust to any BC School Sports Provincial Championship. The person who receives this award also has their name engraved on a plaque, to be permanently displayed in the BCSS office. Only two people receive the award per year. To receive the award, nominees must meet the following criteria:
Must have been involved as a coach/sponsor at the school level.
Must have served administratively on at least two of the following: Executive of a Local Association, Executive of a Sport Commission or member of a Standing Committee.
Must have served at least one full two year term as a member of the BCSS Board of Directors.
Must be, or have been, a teacher or administrator.
Must not currently be a member of the BCSS Board of Directors.

Scholarships

BCSS Dave Gifford Memorial Scholarship
Each year, BC School Sports picks one exceptional male student-athlete and one exceptional female student-athlete to receive a scholarship of $700. The scholarship is in memorial of Dave Gifford, a BCSS Director from 1988–90, he received the award in 1992. He died the same year. Students who receive the award must be athletically eligible, have competed in at least two BCSS sports in their grade 12 year, and have at least a 75% GPA in their 11 and 12 grade years. They must have also made a positive impact on their school and community.

BCSS Zone Scholarships
Each year, British Columbia School Sports picks one student from each of the seven zones to receive a scholarship of $500. The recipient must be athletically eligible and compete in one or more BCSS sports during their grade 12 year. A GPA of at least 75% is required in their grade 11 and 12 year. The zones are:
Zone A: Kootenay Secondary Schools
Zone B: Okanagan Valley Secondary Schools
Zone C: North Central District Secondary
Zone D: Northwest Zone Secondary Schools
Zone E: Vancouver Island Secondary Schools
Zone F: Lower Mainland Secondary Schools
Zone G: Fraser Valley Secondary School

References

Sports governing bodies in British Columbia